Robert B. Davis (June 23, 1926December 21, 1997) was an American mathematician and mathematics educator.

Davis was born in Fall River, Massachusetts.
He graduated from MIT with a B.S, M.S, and Ph.D. (1951) in mathematics. He was a professor and researcher at the University of New Hampshire, Syracuse University, the University of Illinois and Rutgers University, where he was named New Jersey Professor of Mathematics Education in 1988. He was one of the founders of the Madison Project, a study of mathematics education which spanned 15 years. The project is named for Madison Junior High School in Syracuse, where it began. The project moved to Webster College near St, Louis, Missouri in 1961.

Davis was the founding editor of The Journal of Mathematical Behavior (originally The Journal of Children's Mathematical Behavior), with Herbert Ginsburg in 1971.

Davis was given the Ross Taylor/Glenn Gilbert National Leadership Award posthumously by the National Council of Supervisors of Mathematics in 1998.

Selected publications

References

1926 births
1997 deaths
20th-century American mathematicians
Massachusetts Institute of Technology School of Science alumni
Mathematicians from New York (state)
Mathematics educators
People from Fall River, Massachusetts
Rutgers University faculty
Syracuse University faculty
University of New Hampshire alumni